Grevillea concinna, commonly known as red combs or elegant grevillea, is a species of flowering plant in the family Proteaceae and is endemic to the south-west of Western Australia. It is a spreading to erect shrub with mostly linear to narrow wedge-shaped leaves sometimes with a sharp point on the tip. Flower colour varies with subspecies.

Description
The leaves are sometimes divided with two or three linear lobes of the same dimensions as the simple leaves. Flower colour varies with subspecies, being silvery to cream-coloured or yellowish green for subsp. concinna and lemonish-green, later orange-brown.

Taxonomy
Grevillea concinna was first formally described in 1810 by Robert Brown in the Transactions of the Linnean Society of London. The specific epithet (concinna) means "neat, pretty or elegant".

In 1986, Donald McGillivray described two subspecies in his book, New Names in Grevillea (Proteaceae) and the names are accepted by the Australian Plant Census:
 Grevillea concinna subsp. concinna McGill. has silvery to cream-coloured or yellowish-green flowers with a bright red to pink style;
 Grevillea concinna R.Br. subsp. lemanniana has lemony-green flowers, later orange-brown, and a bright red style.

Distribution and habitat
Subspecies concinna grows in coastal shrubland between Cape Le Grand and Lucky Bay and subsp. lehmanniana grows in heath, scrub or shrubland between Boxwood Hill, Needilup, Ravensthorpe and Cape Arid National Park in the Esperance Plains and Mallee biogeographic regions of south-western Western Australia.

Conservation status
Both subspecies of G. concinna'' are listed as "not threatened" by the Department of Biodiversity, Conservation and Attractions.

References

concinna
Eudicots of Western Australia
Proteales of Australia
Taxa named by Robert Brown (botanist, born 1773)
Plants described in 1810